Mustelus mangalorensis also known as the Mangalore houndshark is a species of houndshark in the family Triakidae, found in the Gulf of Aden near southwest India and the Indian Ocean.

References

Fish described in 2011
Mustelus